Tai Wai station is an interchange station on the  and the  of the Mass Transit Railway (MTR) system in Hong Kong. The station is located in Tai Wai, Sha Tin District.

History 

The station opened in a temporary location on 15 August 1983 as part of the greater electrification and double-tracking modernisation programme of the KCR. The original location was on Shing Chuen Road (成全路), north of the current station on the opposite side of  the nullah. The permanent station opened at its present location on 23 April 1986.

In 2001, the station underwent expansion and construction ended in September 2004. The new concourse area was opened in the same month. Southbound passengers from the Tuen Ma line can change to East Rail line trains on the southbound via a station walkway. The cross-platform interchange is similar to that found at other MTR stations.

Automatic platform gates were retrofitted on the Ma On Shan line platforms in 2015–2016.

The Ma On Shan Line was renamed Tuen Ma Line Phase 1 at the time. As opposed to be a terminus Tai Wai station became an intermediate station on this temporary new line. 

Hence, Tai Wai was included in the project and is now an intermediate station on the Tuen Ma line, Hong Kong's longest railway line.

Station layout 

All platforms on the station are side platforms. Platforms 3 and 4 are positioned slightly higher than Platforms 1 and 2.

Platforms 2 and 3 serve southbound trains on the East Rail and Tuen Ma lines respectively and are connected by four large walkways. This makes it possible for southbound passengers to walk directly between the two platforms, without the need to use stairs, escalators or lifts.

Entrances/exits 

A: Tsuen Nam Road 
B: Public Transport Interchange 
C: Mei Tin Road 
D: Grandway Garden 
E: Holford Garden
F: Mei Tin Road
G: Chik Wan Street

See also 

 Sha Tin to Central Link

References 

MTR stations in the New Territories
East Rail line
Ma On Shan line
Sha Tin to Central Link
Tuen Ma line
Tai Wai
Former Kowloon–Canton Railway stations
Railway stations in Hong Kong opened in 1983
1983 establishments in Hong Kong